Kincaid Lake State Park is a park located near Falmouth, Kentucky in Pendleton County. The park encompasses  surrounding Kincaid Lake.

Recreational activities include boating, fishing, miniature golf, hiking, and swimming.

References

External links
Kincaid Lake State Parks Kentucky State Parks

State parks of Kentucky
Protected areas of Pendleton County, Kentucky
Protected areas established in 1963